Wang Jingbin (born 9 May 1995) is a Chinese footballer who currently plays for Liaoning Shenyang Urban in the China League One.

Club career
Wang Jingbin started his football career in when he joined Guizhou Renhe's youth academy in 2010. He then joined China League Two side Shaanxi Laochenggen in the 2012 season and returned to Guizhou shortly after. He transferred to Chinese Super League side Guangzhou Evergrande in 2014 after a successful trial and was promoted to the first team squad in the summer of 2015 by Luiz Felipe Scolari. On 29 July 2016, Wang was loaned to J2 League club Fagiano Okayama until the end of 2016 season. He didn't appear for the Fagi throughout the entirety of his loan spell.

Wang returned to Guangzhou for the 2017 season, and made his senior club debut on 16 April 2017 in a 3–0 away win against Tianjin Teda as the benefit of the new rule of the league that at least one Under-23 player must be in the starting line-up. He was substituted off by Zheng Long in the 27th minute. At the end of the 2017 season, Wang went on to make five appearances for the club in all competitions.

Wang was loaned to China League One side Shanghai Shenxin for one season in February 2018. On 11 March 2018, he made his debut in a 1–0 home loss to Wuhan Zall. He scored his first goal on 10 April 2018 in a 3–1 away win over League Two club Hunan Billows in the third round of 2018 Chinese FA Cup.

International career
On 3 January 2017, Wang was selected in Chinese national team's squad for the 2017 China Cup by Marcello Lippi as the replacement for Wu Lei. He made his debut for China on 10 January 2017 in a 2–0 loss against Iceland, coming on as a substitution for Cao Yunding in the 80th minute. He scored his first international goal on 14 January 2017 in a 1–1 draw with Croatia in the third place playoff.

Career statistics

Club statistics
.

International statistics

International goals

Honours

Club
Guangzhou Evergrande
Chinese Super League: 2015, 2017
AFC Champions League: 2015
Chinese FA Super Cup: 2017

References

External links
 
 

1995 births
Living people
Chinese footballers
Footballers from Liaoning
People from Benxi
Association football forwards
Chinese Super League players
China League One players
China League Two players
Guangzhou F.C. players
Fagiano Okayama players
Shanghai Shenxin F.C. players
Liaoning Shenyang Urban F.C. players
Chinese expatriate footballers
Expatriate footballers in Japan
Chinese expatriate sportspeople in Japan
China international footballers